Chakravakam or Chakravaham (pronounced chakravākam) is a rāgam in Carnatic music (musical scale in South Indian classical music). It is the 16th Melakarta rāgam (parent rāgam) in the 72 melakarta rāgam system. According to the Muthuswami Dikshitar school, this rāgam is called Tōyavēgavāhini. Chakravakam is similar to Raga Ahir bhairav in Hindustani music.

Chakravakam is a raga that is known to incite feelings of devotion, sympathy and compassion in the listeners.

Structure and Lakshana

It is the 4th melakarta in the 3rd chakra- Agni. The mnemonic name is Agni-Bhu. The mnemonic phrase is sa ra gu ma pa dhi ni. Its  structure (ascending and descending scale) is as follows (see swaras in Carnatic music for details on below notation and terms):
 : 
 : 

The notes in this scale are shadjam, shuddha rishabham, anthara gandharam, shuddha madhyamam, panchamam, chathusruthi dhaivatham and kaisiki nishadham.

It is a sampoorna rāgam - rāgam having all 7 swarams. It is the suddha madhyamam equivalent of Ramapriya, which is the 52nd melakarta.

Chakravakam is different from Mayamalavagowla in some ways, while playing. The Ri Ga ma notes are played a bit flatter than Mayamalavagowla, making it sound more restrained than Mayamalavagowla. The Da and Ni are played somewhat like Hari Kambhoji, giving the overall tune, to be restrained and devotional essence

Asampurna Melakarta 
Tōyavēgavāhini is the 16th Melakarta in the original list compiled by Venkatamakhin. The notes used in the scale are the same and the ascending scale and descending scale are same.

Janya rāgams
Chakravakam has quite a few janya rāgams (derived scales) associated with it, of which Bindumalini, Malayamarutam and Valaji are popular.

See List of Janya Ragas for a full list of its janyas.

Popular Compositions
Etula Brotuvo teliya and Sugunamule by Thyagaraja

Kānakkankoti vendum by Koteeswara Iyer

Gajānanayutham By Muthuswami Dikshitar

Mullu Koneya Mele By Purandara Dasa

Kada Beladingalu By Sripadaraja

Sarojanabha by Maharaja Swathi Thirunal

Sri Amruta Phalâmbike by Kalyani Varadarajan

Pibare Ramarasam (version by Balamuralikrishna) by Sadashiva Brahmendra

Film Songs
"Albela Sajan" from "Hum Dil De Chuke Sanam" (Hindi), "Poochho Na Kaise Maine Rain Bitai" from "Meri Surat Teri Ankhen" (Hindi) and "Raakkili Than" from "Perumazhakalam" (Malayalam).

Language:Tamil

Janya:Rasikaranjani Ragam

Album

Related rāgams
This section covers the theoretical and scientific aspect of this rāgam.

Chakravakam's notes when shifted using Graha bhedam, yields 2 other major melakarta rāgams, namely, Sarasangi and Dharmavati. Graha bhedam is the step taken in keeping the relative note frequencies same, while shifting the Shadjam to the next note in the rāgam. For an illustration refer Graha bhedam on Dharmavati.

Notes

References

External links
Carnatic musician Charulatha Mani describes Chakravakam (Tamil)
Carnatic violinist Aishu Venkataraman performs Chakravakam

Melakarta ragas